The women's team competition of the table tennis event at the 2009 Southeast Asian Games will be held from 8 to 10 December at the Convention Hall, National University of Laos in Vientiane, Laos.

Schedule
All times are Laos Time (UTC+07:00).

Results

Group round

Group A

Group B

Elimination rounds

Semi-finals

Final

References

External links
 

2009 Southeast Asian Games events
2009
2009 in table tennis